Filip Panjeskovic (born 16 January 2003) is a Danish professional footballer who plays as a centre-back for Danish 1st Division club Hillerød.

Club career

Lyngby
Born in Hillerød, Panjeskovic played youth football for Hillerød Fodbold and attended folkeskole at Hillerødsholmskolen. In 2017, he moved to the Lyngby Boldklub youth academy.

He made his Danish Superliga debut for Lyngby on 8 July 2020 in a game against SønderjyskE. In October 2020, Panjeskovic suffered a season-ending knee injury. He suffered relegation to the Danish 1st Division with the club on 9 May 2021 after a loss to last placed AC Horsens.

On 28 May 2022, Lyngby Boldklub announced that Panjeskovic's expiring contract would not be extended, making him a free agent after the 2021–22 season.

Hillerød
Panjeskovic returned to his former club Hillerød prior to the 2022–23 season, the club's inaugural season in the 1st Division after winning promotion. He made his debut on 30 July 2022, coming on as a half-time substitute for Lucas Lykkegaard in a 5–1 loss to SønderjyskE.

Career statistics

References

External links

2003 births
Living people
People from Hillerød Municipality
Danish men's footballers
Denmark youth international footballers
Association football defenders
Hillerød Fodbold players
Lyngby Boldklub players
Danish Superliga players
Danish 1st Division players
Danish people of Serbian descent
Sportspeople from the Capital Region of Denmark